Benjamin Nigel David Doane (born 22 December 1979) is an English, former footballer who played as a defender. Born in Sheffield he spent his entire playing career with his hometown club, Sheffield United save for two short loan spells with Kettering Town and Mansfield Town.

Career
Doane was a product of Sheffield United's youth system and, on graduating to the senior squad, signed a professional deal in July 1998. Having made his debut in a 3–0 League Cup victory over Shrewsbury Town in August 1999, Doane was the fringes of the first-team for a number of years, and was never able to maintain any consistent form, making only sporadic appearances for the Blades. In January 2000 Doane was loaned to Conference Premier side Kettering Town for the remainder of the season, where he made four appearances for the Poppies before returning to Bramall Lane.

Doane continued to make occasional appearances for United, with his most consistent run coming in the Autumn of 2001 when he made eight consecutive starts. Having received a red card during a league game against Walsall in November of that year, Doane returned from his suspension to find himself largely relegated to the reserves once more. However, he did score his first goal the club in a 2–2 draw with Crewe Alexandra on 30 March 2002. The following season Doane agreed a three-month loan deal with Second Division side Mansfield Town, where he played regularly, making eleven appearances.

Returning to United after his successful loan spell, Doane was recalled to the Blades first team for a league game against Wimbledon but sustained a serious ankle injury in the closing stages of the match. Doane never recovered from this injury and was forced to retire from playing in May 2003.

Career statistics
.

References

External links
 

1979 births
Living people
Footballers from Sheffield
English footballers
Association football defenders
Sheffield United F.C. players
Kettering Town F.C. players
Mansfield Town F.C. players
English Football League players
National League (English football) players